Josh van der Flier (born 25 April 1993) is an Irish rugby union player for Leinster and Ireland. His preferred position is flanker, but he can play other positions if needed. Van der Flier is of Dutch descent through his paternal grandparents, who moved to Ireland in the 1950s to open a radiator factory. He is commonly referred to amongst Leinster Rugby circles as ‘The Dutch Disciple’.

Leinster
He began his professional career with the Leinster academy. During his time at the academy, he played with the Leinster senior team, making his debut in October 2014 against Zebre. It was announced in April 2015 that he had been awarded a senior contract with Leinster. 

Following the 2022 Champions Cup final Van der Flier became the third Leinster player to win European player of the year, after Sean O’Brien (2011) and Rob Kearney (2012). In June 2022 he was named Leinster's 2021–22 Men's Player of the Year.

International career
Van der Flier received his first call up to the senior Ireland squad by coach Joe Schmidt for the 2016 Six Nations Championship.
Van der Flier debuted for Ireland on 27 February against England in the 2016 Six Nations Championship at Twickenham. 

He was named as the Ireland men’s XVs Players’ Player of the Year at the 2022 Rugby Players Ireland awards. He also won the Guinness Rugby Writers of Ireland men’s player of the year award for the 2021-22 campaign.
 
In November 2022, Van der Flier was named as the World Rugby Men's 15s Player of the Year.

International tries 
As of 5 November 2022

Honours

Leinster
Heineken Cup (1): 2017–18
Pro14 (4): 2017–18, 2018–19, 2019–20, 2020–21

Ireland
Six Nations Championship (2): 2018, 2023
Grand Slam (2): 2018, 2023
Triple Crown (3): 2018, 2022, 2023
2022 Ireland rugby union tour of New Zealand Series win 1

Awards
EPCR European Player of the Year: 2022
World Rugby Player of the Year: 2022

References

External links

Leinster Profile
Ireland Profile
Pro14 Profile

1993 births
Living people
Irish people of Dutch descent
Irish rugby union players
Leinster Rugby players
University College Dublin R.F.C. players
Alumni of University College Dublin
People educated at Wesley College, Dublin
Ireland international rugby union players
Rugby union players from County Wicklow
Rugby union flankers